Li Shanshan (born 6 January 1992) is a Chinese female discus thrower, who won an individual gold medal at the Youth World Championships.

References

External links

1992 births
Living people
Chinese female discus throwers
21st-century Chinese women